The persecution of Kurds is the ethnic and political persecution which is inflicted upon Kurds by the governments of Iran, Syria, Turkey, and Iraq.

20th century
Earliest known persecution of Kurds was after World War I, the newly declared Turkish Republic leader Mustafa Kemal Atatürk repudiated the Treaty of Sèvres which proposed a referendum be conducted in the Kurdish homeland. As a result, conflict continued between the Turkish military and the Kurds. This conflict still exists today.

After the Dersim rebellion, 13,160 civilians were killed by the Turkish Army and 11,818 people were exiled, depopulating the province. Nuri Dersimi stated that many tribesmen were killed after surrendering, and women and children were locked into haysheds which were then lit on fire. 30,000 Kurds were massacred by the Turkish Army after the rebellion.

The Zilan massacre killed about 15,000 Kurdish civilians and the Zilan River was full to the brim with dead bodies.

The Kuşkonar massacre killed 38 people, 13 in Koçağılı and 25 in Kuşkonar. Most of the victims were children, women or elderly, including seven babies. 13 people were injured. Later the Turkish Armed Forces blamed the PKK and used the massacre as propaganda. The Turkish government refused to start investigating despite complaints of surviving villagers.

The 3-year-long Anfal campaign Killed 50,000 to 100,000 non-combatant Kurdish civilians. Kurdish officials claimed the figure could be as high as 182,000. 1,754 schools, 270 hospitals, 2,450 mosques, 90% of the Kurdish villages were destroyed.;

21st century
The 2021 Konya massacre was the killing of a Kurdish family in Turkey. 4 women and 3 men were killed as a result. According to an interview given by members of the family to Duvar, the attackers where close to the far-right Nationalist Movement Party (MHP) who did not want to permit Kurds to live in the neighborhood.

The Roboski massacre was the killings of 40 Kurdish villagers on the night of December 28, 2011. They were coming from Iraq towards the Turkish border. They were mostly teenagers from the Encü family of Ortasu (in ) in the Uludere district of Şırnak Province, Turkey. They were smuggling cigarettes, diesel fuel and other goods into Turkey, riding on mules.

Later in 2020, Pro-Iran protesters torched Kurdish party offices in Baghdad.

List

References

Persecution of Kurds
Anti-Kurdish sentiment